The 1991–92 USC Trojans men's basketball team represented the University of Southern California during the 1991–92 NCAA Division I men's basketball season. Led by head coach George Raveling, they played their home games at the L. A. Sports Arena in Los Angeles, California as members of the Pac-10 Conference.

Roster

Schedule and results

|-
!colspan=9 style=| Non-conference regular season

|-
!colspan=9 style=| Pac-10 regular season

|-
!colspan=9 style=| NCAA Tournament

Rankings

Awards and honors
Harold Miner – Pac-10 Player of the Year, Consensus First-team All-American
George Raveling – Pac-10 Coach of the Year, Kodak National Coach of the Year

Team Players in the 1992 NBA draft

References

Usc Trojans
USC Trojans men's basketball seasons
USC
USC Trojans
USC Trojans